The slender-billed flufftail (Sarothrura watersi) is a species of bird in the family Sarothruridae.
It is found in highlands of eastern Madagascar.

Its natural habitats are swamps and arable land.
It is threatened by habitat loss.

References

External links
BirdLife Species Factsheet.

slender-billed flufftail
Endemic birds of Madagascar
slender-billed flufftail
Taxa named by Edward Bartlett
Taxonomy articles created by Polbot